The Life of Jane Dormer, Duchess of Feria was a chronicle written by Jane Dormer, lady-in-waiting to Mary I of England.

References

External links
 A facsimile of the complete text.

Tudor England
English chronicles